Abu Taher Khuzaima Qutbuddin (5 June 1940  30 March 2016) was the son of the 51st Da'i al-Mutlaq, half brother of the 52nd Da'i and a Mazoon of the Dawoodi Bohras, a subgroup within the Mustaali, Ismaili Shia branch of Islam. Qutbuddin was appointed as Mazoon by the Da'i al-Mutlaq, Syedna Muhammad Burhanuddin in 1965.

Qutbuddin, a half-brother of Syedna Mohammed Burhanuddin and a rival claimant to the title of Dai-al-Mutlaq, claimed that his half-brother appointed him heir in 1965 while conferring on him the title of "mazoon". Contrary to the claim, Mufaddal Saifuddin son of Late Syedna Burhanuddin claimed that his father had declared "nass" (succession) on him in London on 4 June 2011, and many times before.

Personal life

He is eleventh son of the 51st Da'i al-Mutlaq [[Taher 
Syedna Qutbuddin died on 30 March 2016 in California.

Succession controversy

See also
 Ismailism
 Fatimid

References

External links
 

1940 births
2016 deaths
Indian Islamic religious leaders
Dawoodi Bohras